The common wood pigeon or common woodpigeon (Columba palumbus), also known as simply wood pigeon, wood-pigeon or woodpigeon, is a large species in the dove and pigeon family (Columbidae), native to the western Palearctic. It belongs to the genus Columba, which includes closely related species such as the rock dove (Columba livia). It has historically been known as the ring dove, and is locally known in southeast England as the "culver"; the latter name has given rise to several areas known for keeping pigeons to be named after it, such as Culver Down. It has a flexible diet, predominantly feeding on vegetable matter, including cereal crops, leading to them being regarded as an agricultural pest. Wood pigeons are extensively hunted over large parts of their range, but this does not seem to have a great impact on their population.

Taxonomy
The common wood pigeon was formally described by the Swedish naturalist Carl Linnaeus in 1758 in the tenth edition of his Systema Naturae. He placed it with all the other pigeons in the genus Columba and coined the binomial name Columba palumbus. The specific epithet palumbus is from the Latin palumbes for a wood pigeon.

Five subspecies are recognised, one of which is now extinct:

 C. p. palumbus Linnaeus, 1758 – Europe to western Siberia and Iraq; Northwest Africa
 † C. p. maderensis Tschusi, 1904 – Madeira (extinct)
 C. p. azorica Hartert, 1905 – the eastern and central Azores
 C. p. iranica (Zarudny, 1910) – southwestern and northern Iran to southwestern Turkmenistan
 C. p. casiotis (Bonaparte, 1854) – southeastern Iran and Kazakhstan to western China, northwestern India and Nepal
† = extinct

Description 

It is otherwise a basically grey bird, with a pinkish breast. Adult birds bear a series of green and white patches on their necks, and a pink patch on their chest. The eye colour is a pale yellow, in contrast to that of rock doves, which is orange-red, and the stock pigeon, which is black.

Juvenile birds do not have the white patches on either side of the neck. When they are about 6 months old (about three months out of the nest) they gain small white patches on both sides of the neck, which gradually enlarge until they are fully formed when the bird is about 6–8 months old (approx. ages only). Juvenile birds also have a greyer beak and an overall lighter grey appearance than adult birds.

Distribution and habitat 
In the colder northern and eastern parts of Europe and western Asia the common wood pigeon is a migrant, but in southern and western Europe it is a well distributed and often abundant resident. In Great Britain wood pigeons are commonly seen in parks and gardens and are seen with increasing numbers in towns and cities.

Behaviour 

Its flight is quick, performed by regular beats, with an occasional sharp flick of the wings, characteristic of pigeons in general. It takes off with a loud clattering. It perches well, and in its nuptial display walks along a horizontal branch with swelled neck, lowered wings, and fanned tail. During the display flight the bird climbs, the wings are smartly cracked like a whiplash, and the bird glides down on stiff wings. The common wood pigeon is gregarious, often forming very large flocks outside the breeding season. Like many species of pigeon, wood pigeons take advantage of trees and buildings to gain a vantage point over the surrounding area, and their distinctive call means that they are usually heard before they are seen.

Wood pigeons are known to fiercely defend their territory, and will fight each other to gain access to nesting and roosting locations. Male wood pigeons will typically attempt to drive competitors off by threat displays and pursuit, but will also directly fight, jumping and striking their rival with both wings.

This species can be an agricultural pest, and it is often shot, being a legal quarry species in most European countries. It is wary in rural areas, but often quite tame where it is not persecuted.

Breeding 
 It breeds in trees in woods, parks and gardens, laying two white eggs in a simple stick nest which hatch after 17 to 19 days. Wood pigeons seem to have a preference for trees near roadways and rivers. Males exhibit aggressive behaviour towards each other during the breeding season by jumping and flapping wings at each other. Their plumage becomes much darker, especially the head, during hot summer periods. Breeding can happen year round if there is food abundant however breeding season most commonly occurs in autumn usually in the months of August and September.

The nests are vulnerable to attack, particularly by crows. The young usually fly at 33 to 34 days; however, if the nest is disturbed, some young may be able to survive having left the nest as early as 20 days from hatching.

In a study carried out using ring-recovery data, the survival rate for juveniles in their first year was 52 per cent, and the adult annual survival rate was 61 per cent. For birds that survive the first year the typical lifespan is thus only three years, but the maximum recorded age is 17 years and 8 months for a bird ringed and recovered on the Orkney Islands.

Diet 
Most of its diet is vegetable, round and fleshy leaves from Caryophyllaceae, Asteraceae, and cruciferous vegetables taken from open fields or gardens and lawns; young shoots and seedlings are favoured, and it will take grain, pine nuts, and certain fruits and berries. In the autumn they also eat figs and acorns, and in winter buds of trees and bushes. They will also eat larvae, ants, and small worms. They need open water to drink and bathe in. Young common wood pigeons swiftly become fat, as a result of the crop milk they are fed by their parents. This is an extremely rich fluid that is produced in the adult birds' crops during the breeding season. Due to their feeding on cereal crops, wood pigeons are considered an agricultural pest.

Calls 
The call of the wood pigeon is a loud and sustained characteristic cooing, coo-COO-COO--coo-coo. In Ireland and the UK, the traditional mnemonic for the distinctive call of the bird has been interpreted as "Take two cows, Teddy", or "Take two cows, Taffy". Another interpretation for the birdsong has been "My toe bleeds, Betty".

Predators 
Predators of the wood pigeon typically consist of the Eurasian sparrowhawk, northern goshawk and domestic cat. The eggs and babies of wood pigeons are also often predated by crows.

In culture
The wood pigeon is mentioned several times in the Eclogues written by the ancient Roman poet Virgil. Referring to its distinctive husky call, Virgil writes in Eclogue 1;
Here beneath high rocks
The gatherers of leaves, with cheerful songs
Fill the high winds. Meanwhile thy turtle doves
And hoarse wood pigeons from the lofty elms
Make endless moan.

References

Sources

External links 

 Xeno-canto: audio recordings of the common wood pigeon
 Wood pigeon videos, photos & sounds on the Internet Bird Collection
 Ageing and sexing of the common wood pigeon by Javier Blasco-Zumeta & Gerd-Michael Heinze
 Feathers of Common Wood Pigeon (Columba palumbus) by Hans Schick 

common wood pigeon
Birds of Afghanistan
Birds of Europe
Birds of Western Asia
Birds described in 1758
Taxa named by Carl Linnaeus
Articles containing video clips